Poet Laureate of Kentucky is a title awarded to a Kentucky poet by the state's Art Council. In 2013, the position was occupied by Frank X Walker, the first African-American to be so honored.

The Poet Laureate position was established 1926 by an act of the Kentucky General Assembly. James T. Cotton Noe was the first laureate. Originally appointed to lifetime terms, following 1990 legislation laureates have been appointed by the governor to two-year terms.

List of Poets Laureate

Poets laureate of Kentucky include:
 James Thomas “Cotton” Noe (1926)
 Edward G. Hill (1928)
 Louise Phillips (1942)
 Edwin Carlisle Litsey (1954)
 Jesse Hilton Stuart (1954)
 Lowell Allen Williams (1956)
 Lillie D. Chaffin (1974)
 Senator Tom Mobley (1976)
 Agnes O’Rear (1978)
 Soc Clay (1984)
 Lee Pennington (1984)
 Paul Salyers (1984)
 Dale Faughn (1986)
 Jim Wayne Miller (1986)
 Henry E. Pilkenton (1986)
 James H. Patton, Jr. (1990)
 James Still (1995-1996)  
 Joy Bale Boone (1997-1998)  
 Richard Taylor (1999-2000)       
 James Baker Hall (2001-2002)      
 Joe Survant (2003-2004)      
 Sena Jeter Naslund (2005-2006)       
 Jane Gentry Vance (2007-2008)       
 Gurney Norman (2009-2010)       
 Maureen Morehead (2011-2012)      
 Frank X Walker (2013-2014)       
 George Ella Lyon (2015-2016)       
 Frederick Smock (2017-2018)      
 Jeff Worley (2019-2020)   
Crystal Wilkinson (2021-2022)

References

External links
 Library of Congress list of Kentucky Poets Laureate

See also

Sparks, Betty J., Poets Laureate of Kentucky Wind Publications. 2004. 

Kentucky culture
1926 establishments in Kentucky
American Poets Laureate